Anton P. Mardesich (January 11, 1919 – June 10, 1949) was an American commercial fisherman and politician in the state of Washington. He served in the Washington House of Representatives from 1949 to 1950 for district 38. He was killed in a fishing accident in 1949, along with his father, Nicola. His brother, August P. Mardesich, who had survived the ordeal, later succeeded him in the House of Representatives.

References

1919 births
1949 deaths
People from San Pedro, Los Angeles
Democratic Party members of the Washington House of Representatives
20th-century American politicians